Damochlora millepunctata is a species of air-breathing land snails, terrestrial pulmonate gastropod mollusks. This species is endemic to Australia.

References

Gastropods of Australia
Damochlora
Endangered fauna of Australia
Gastropods described in 1894
Taxonomy articles created by Polbot